Gaibandha-5 is a constituency represented in the Jatiya Sangsad (National Parliament) of Bangladesh since 2023 by Mahmud Hasan Ripon of the Awami League.

Boundaries 
The constituency encompasses Fulchhari and Saghata upazilas.

History 
The constituency was created in 1984 from a Rangpur constituency when the former Rangpur District was split into five districts: Nilphamari, Lalmonirhat, Rangpur, Kurigram, and Gaibandha.

Members of Parliament

Elections

Elections in the 2020s

Elections in the 2010s 
Fazle Rabbi Miah was re-elected unopposed in the 2014 general election after opposition parties withdrew their candidacies in a boycott of the election.

Elections in the 2000s

Elections in the 1990s

References

External links
 

Parliamentary constituencies in Bangladesh
Gaibandha District